General elections were held in the Cook Islands on 24 March 1994 to elect 25 MPs to the Parliament.  The election was a landslide victory for the Cook Islands Party, which won 20 seats.  The Democratic Party won three seats, and the newly established Alliance Party two.

Results

References

Elections in the Cook Islands
Cook
1994 in the Cook Islands
Cook
Election and referendum articles with incomplete results